Highway 995 is a provincial highway in the far north region of the Canadian province of Saskatchewan. It is one of the few highways in Saskatchewan that is completely isolated (by land) from the other highways. It is about 5 km (3 mi) long. Seasonal access is provided to Highway 905 by way of the Wollaston Lake Barge. 

Highway 995 runs along a small portion of the south-eastern shore of Wollaston Lake. It runs from the community of Wollaston Lake, where there is a  local airport, to a community on Hatchet Lake. No other communities lie on this highway. 

The entire highway is unpaved.

See also
Roads in Saskatchewan
Transportation in Saskatchewan

References

995